Prime News may refer to:

 Prime News (Canadian TV program), a Canadian news program that previously aired in Regina, Saskatoon and Winnipeg under this title
 Prime News (U.S. TV program), a 2005–2012 American weeknight news program that aired on HLN channel
 Prime News New Zealand, a news bulletin shown on Prime Television New Zealand, produced by MediaWorks
 Prime7 News, a local news service in Australia, produced by Prime7, formerly known as Prime News